The Philippines has submitted films for the Academy Award for Best International Feature Film  since the inception of the category in 1956. The award is given annually by the United States Academy of Motion Picture Arts and Sciences (AMPAS) to a feature-length motion picture produced outside the United States that contains primarily non-English dialogue. The "Best Foreign Language Film" category was not created until 1956; however, between 1947 and 1955, the Academy presented a non-competitive Honorary Award for the best foreign language films released in the United States.

The Film Academy of the Philippines (FAP), headed by acting director general Manny Morfe, appoints a committee to choose one film among those released that year to be submitted as the Philippines's official entry to the Academy for a nomination for "Best International Feature Film" the following year. The chosen films, along with their English subtitles, are sent to the Academy, where they are screened for the jury. The 1953 biopic Genghis Khan was the first Filipino film submitted for consideration for the Honorary Foreign Language Film award, the precursor to the current category. From 1956 until the establishment of the FAP in 1981, only four films were submitted for considerationChild of Sorrow (1956), The Moises Padilla Story (1961), Because of a Flower (1967), and Ganito Kami Noon... Paano Kayo Ngayon? (1976). After the FAP was founded, the Philippines submitted Of the Flesh in 1984 and This Is My Country in 1985, but made no submissions until 1995's Harvest Home. Since then, the FAP has submitted a film in most years. In 2005, no film was submitted after it was revealed by then FAP director general Leo Martinez that the organization did not receive an invitation from the AMPAS. In 2021, the FAP controversially chose not to send an entry as they lacked government funding due to the COVID-19 pandemic. In total, the Philippines has made 33 submissions to the category, but none have been nominated for an Oscar, the latest being the 2022 submission On the Job: The Missing 8.

Filmakers Marilou Diaz-Abaya and Gil Portes have each represented the Philippines three times in this category, the most for any director—including two consecutive films each: Diaz Abaya in 1997 and 1998, and Portes in 2001 and 2002. Cannes Film Festival Award recipient Brillante Mendoza has directed two films that were submitted in 2016 and 2020. Four films starring John Arcilla have been submitted for consideration in the category, of these however, the 2013 independent crime drama Metro Manila produced by British director Sean Ellis was the United Kingdom's submission at the 86th Academy Awards. Joel Torre has co-starred in three films that were entries in 1984, 1985, and 2000. Two of Judy Ann Santos's films, including Ploning (2008), which she produced and starred in, were submitted. Angel Aquino, Sid Lucero, Phillip Salvador, Vilma Santos, and Jomari Yllana have each represented the Philippines twice as actors in the category.

Submissions

See also

 List of countries by number of Academy Awards for Best International Feature Film
 List of Academy Award winners and nominees for Best International Feature Film
 List of Academy Award–winning foreign-language films
 Cinema of the Philippines

Notes

References

External links 

 Academy of Motion Picture Arts and Sciences official website

Philippines
Academy Award